Rush River is the name of several communities in the United States:
Rush River, Minnesota
Rush River Township in North Dakota
Rush River, Wisconsin

Rush River is the name of several rivers in the United States:
Rush River (Minnesota)
Rush River (North Dakota) in North Dakota
Rush River (Virginia) in Virginia
Rush River (Wisconsin)